Google Podcasts is a podcast application developed by Google and released on June 18, 2018, for Android devices.

History 
In September, 2018, Google Cast support was added to Google Podcasts. At Google I/O 2019, Google announced a web version of Google Podcasts for iOS, Android, and Windows. The iOS version launched in March 2020. In November 2019, the app received a redesign using  Google Material Theme. On May 12, 2020, Google announced that users can transfer their podcast subscriptions, and history to Google Podcasts from Google Play Music.

In 2023, Google podcast executives Chuk and Steve McClendon announced that podcasts would be added to YouTube Music in the near future.

References

External links
 

Google software
Podcasting software
Android (operating system) software